This article lists the most visited museums in the world.  A museum is defined as a building or institution dedicated to the acquisition, care, research, and exhibition of numerous objects that represent the legacy of humankind and its environment. The primary sources are the Art Newspaper annual report on art museum attendance, and the TEA-AECOM Museum Index, published by the Themed Entertainment Association and AECOM consulting firm; as well as national surveys, such as the National Museum Information Survey of the Chinese Government, and the Association of Leading Visitor Attractions (ALVA) in Britain. 

Due to the COVID-19 pandemic, most museum's total attendance has been drastically lower since 2020. The top twenty museums on the list in 2021 rebounded  to 13,433,000, an increase of 70 percent over 2020, but only 33 percent of the total attendance in 2019, before the pandemic.

Criteria for inclusion

This list includes art museums, history museums, natural history museums, and science museums, but does not include archaeological sites, historical monuments, or many palace museums. This article generally follows that guideline, so the Palace of Versailles, the Kremlin, Peterhof Palace, and Forbidden City are not included, even though these sites include some museum collections. Such palace museums are found in the list of most visited palaces and monuments.

The list also includes the Mevlana Museum, a mausoleum and religious shrine which is classified by the Turkish government as a museum. It does not include Hagia Sophia, which the Turkish government reclassified as a mosque in 2020.

Due to differences in reporting across regions, there is some variation in the time periods for which figures are reported. Unless otherwise noted, figures for North America and continental Europe are calendar year figures, while most figures for Britain and Asia-Pacific are fiscal year figures, from April through March.

List

2022

2021

2020

2019

See also

List of most-visited art museums
List of most-visited museums by region
List of largest art museums
List of most visited palaces and monuments
List of most visited museums in the Netherlands
List of most visited museums in the United Kingdom
List of most-visited museums in the United States

Notes

References

Lists of art museums and galleries
Lists of museums
Museums